Saki Nakajima may refer to:

Saki Nakajima (voice actress) (born 1978), Japanese voice actress
Saki Nakajima (singer) (born 1994), J-pop singer in the Hello! Project group °C-ute